Richard St. Denis is an attorney from Colorado, a Top 10 CNN Hero of 2011, and a founder of World Access Project, which since 2008 has provided hundreds of wheelchairs and mobility aids to people living with disabilities in rural Mexico.

He was injured while skiing in Lake Tahoe, California in 1976 and has used a wheelchair ever since. His World Access Project collects used wheelchairs from hospitals, nursing homes, medical supply businesses, and individual donors from across the United States.

References

Further reading

External links
 World Access Project website

Living people
Year of birth missing (living people)
Activists from Colorado 
Colorado lawyers
Lawyers with disabilities
American disability rights activists
Place of birth missing (living people)